is a Japanese rugby union player who plays as a wing. He currently plays for Suntory Sungoliath in Japan's domestic Top League. Emi also represented Japan at rugby sevens, playing for them at the 2013 World Cup.

References

1991 births
Living people
Japanese rugby union players
Rugby union wings
Sunwolves players
Tokyo Sungoliath players
21st-century Japanese people